Phou Bia (Lao: ພູເບັ້ຍ) is the highest mountain in Laos. It is in the Annamese Cordillera, at the southern limit of the Xiangkhoang Plateau in Xiangkhouang Province. Owing to its elevation—2,819 m (9,249 ft), the highest terrestrial point in Laos, the climate is cold and the area around the mountain is mostly cloudy.

History
Although no snow has been reported for decades, it is claimed that as late as the first years of the 20th century, snow fell occasionally on its summit.

On 10 April 1970, an Air America C-130A aircraft crashed into the mountain.

The area is remote, covered with jungle, and has been used by Hmong guerilla soldiers. In the 1970s, c. 60,000 Hmong supporting FAC operations took refuge at the Phou Bia massif. There have been reports of smaller Hmong hideouts in the area as recently as 2006.

Phou Bia rises in a restricted military area near the abandoned Long Chen air base, and for this reason sees few outside visitors. Unexploded ordnance further complicates access. As of July 2008, there had been no known ascent by a non-Lao person for at least 30 years.

In 2021, Xaisomboun Province officials announced the development of Phou Bia Mountain as a "sustainable development tourism site", valued at some US$500 million. The development will center on Phou Houa Xang Village, in Anouvong District, Xaisomboun, under a 99 year concession.

See also
List of mountains in Laos
List of Southeast Asian mountains

References

External links
Map of Laos (physical)

Mountains of Laos
Geography of Xiangkhouang province
Highest points of countries